Pingdingshan was a village in Dongzhou District, Fushun City, Liaoning Province, China. Most of the population was killed during the Pingdingshan massacre.

See also 
 Pingdingshan massacre

References 

Former villages in China
Fushun